Joshua Bailey is an English professional footballer who plays as a defender for  club Shrewsbury Town.

Playing career
Bailey made his senior debut for Shrewsbury Town in a 4–0 defeat to Port Vale at the New Meadow on 20 September 2022.

Bailey made his league debut for Shrewsbury Town in a 0-1 loss against Barnsley on 12 November 2022.

Statistics

References

Living people
English footballers
Association football midfielders
Shrewsbury Town F.C. players
Year of birth missing (living people)